The Lermontovsky Constituency (No.147) is a Russian legislative constituency in Penza Oblast. The constituency covers western Penza Oblast and parts of the city of Penza.

Members elected

Election results

1993

|-
! colspan=2 style="background-color:#E9E9E9;text-align:left;vertical-align:top;" |Candidate
! style="background-color:#E9E9E9;text-align:left;vertical-align:top;" |Party
! style="background-color:#E9E9E9;text-align:right;" |Votes
! style="background-color:#E9E9E9;text-align:right;" |%
|-
|style="background-color:"|
|align=left|Valery Goryachev
|align=left|Yavlinsky—Boldyrev—Lukin
|
|27.07%
|-
|style="background-color:"|
|align=left|Mikhail Sharov
|align=left|Independent
| -
|13.80%
|-
| colspan="5" style="background-color:#E9E9E9;"|
|- style="font-weight:bold"
| colspan="3" style="text-align:left;" | Total
| 
| 100%
|-
| colspan="5" style="background-color:#E9E9E9;"|
|- style="font-weight:bold"
| colspan="4" |Source:
|
|}

1995

|-
! colspan=2 style="background-color:#E9E9E9;text-align:left;vertical-align:top;" |Candidate
! style="background-color:#E9E9E9;text-align:left;vertical-align:top;" |Party
! style="background-color:#E9E9E9;text-align:right;" |Votes
! style="background-color:#E9E9E9;text-align:right;" |%
|-
|style="background-color:"|
|align=left|Aleksandr Rygalov
|align=left|Agrarian Party
|
|40.35%
|-
|style="background-color:"|
|align=left|Valery Goryachev (incumbent)
|align=left|Yabloko
|
|14.64%
|-
|style="background-color:"|
|align=left|Sergey Korobov
|align=left|Liberal Democratic Party
|
|9.63%
|-
|style="background-color:#23238E"|
|align=left|Yury Zatsepin
|align=left|Our Home – Russia
|
|5.34%
|-
|style="background-color:#265BAB"|
|align=left|Yury Grishin
|align=left|Russian Lawyers' Association
|
|3.41%
|-
|style="background-color:"|
|align=left|Vladimir Fomin
|align=left|Independent
|
|3.40%
|-
|style="background-color:"|
|align=left|Pyotr Bredikhin
|align=left|Independent
|
|2.80%
|-
|style="background-color:#3A46CE"|
|align=left|Vladimir Didenko
|align=left|Democratic Choice of Russia – United Democrats
|
|2.79%
|-
|style="background-color:#DA2021"|
|align=left|Anatoly Aleksyutin
|align=left|Ivan Rybkin Bloc
|
|2.54%
|-
|style="background-color:"|
|align=left|Rinat Galiakberov
|align=left|Independent
|
|1.98%
|-
|style="background-color:#0D0900"|
|align=left|Gennady Filatov
|align=left|People's Union
|
|1.90%
|-
|style="background-color:#A8A821"|
|align=left|Aleksandr Sergeyenko
|align=left|Stable Russia
|
|0.86%
|-
|style="background-color:#000000"|
|colspan=2 |against all
|
|8.66%
|-
| colspan="5" style="background-color:#E9E9E9;"|
|- style="font-weight:bold"
| colspan="3" style="text-align:left;" | Total
| 
| 100%
|-
| colspan="5" style="background-color:#E9E9E9;"|
|- style="font-weight:bold"
| colspan="4" |Source:
|
|}

1999

|-
! colspan=2 style="background-color:#E9E9E9;text-align:left;vertical-align:top;" |Candidate
! style="background-color:#E9E9E9;text-align:left;vertical-align:top;" |Party
! style="background-color:#E9E9E9;text-align:right;" |Votes
! style="background-color:#E9E9E9;text-align:right;" |%
|-
|style="background-color:#3B9EDF"|
|align=left|Igor Rudensky
|align=left|Fatherland – All Russia
|
|36.28%
|-
|style="background-color:"|
|align=left|Yury Lyzhin
|align=left|Communist Party
|
|29.97%
|-
|style="background:"| 
|align=left|Valery Goryachev
|align=left|Yabloko
|
|7.74%
|-
|style="background-color:"|
|align=left|Viktor Yermakov
|align=left|Independent
|
|6.86%
|-
|style="background-color:"|
|align=left|Viktor Dyuldin
|align=left|Independent
|
|2.41%
|-
|style="background-color:#FF4400"|
|align=left|Sergey Korobov
|align=left|Andrey Nikolayev and Svyatoslav Fyodorov Bloc
|
|2.34%
|-
|style="background-color:#000000"|
|colspan=2 |against all
|
|11.80%
|-
| colspan="5" style="background-color:#E9E9E9;"|
|- style="font-weight:bold"
| colspan="3" style="text-align:left;" | Total
| 
| 100%
|-
| colspan="5" style="background-color:#E9E9E9;"|
|- style="font-weight:bold"
| colspan="4" |Source:
|
|}

2003

|-
! colspan=2 style="background-color:#E9E9E9;text-align:left;vertical-align:top;" |Candidate
! style="background-color:#E9E9E9;text-align:left;vertical-align:top;" |Party
! style="background-color:#E9E9E9;text-align:right;" |Votes
! style="background-color:#E9E9E9;text-align:right;" |%
|-
|style="background-color:"|
|align=left|Igor Rudensky (incumbent)
|align=left|United Russia
|
|62.95%
|-
|style="background-color:"|
|align=left|Viktor Ilyukhin
|align=left|Communist Party
|
|20.82%
|-
|style="background:"| 
|align=left|Aleksandr Seynov
|align=left|Yabloko
|
|2.85%
|-
|style="background:#7C73CC"| 
|align=left|Viktor Dyuldin
|align=left|Great Russia–Eurasian Union
|
|1.59%
|-
|style="background:#164C8C"| 
|align=left|Valentina Yazvenko
|align=left|United Russian Party Rus'
|
|0.83%
|-
|style="background-color:#000000"|
|colspan=2 |against all
|
|9.16%
|-
| colspan="5" style="background-color:#E9E9E9;"|
|- style="font-weight:bold"
| colspan="3" style="text-align:left;" | Total
| 
| 100%
|-
| colspan="5" style="background-color:#E9E9E9;"|
|- style="font-weight:bold"
| colspan="4" |Source:
|
|}

2016

|-
! colspan=2 style="background-color:#E9E9E9;text-align:left;vertical-align:top;" |Candidate
! style="background-color:#E9E9E9;text-align:leftt;vertical-align:top;" |Party
! style="background-color:#E9E9E9;text-align:right;" |Votes
! style="background-color:#E9E9E9;text-align:right;" |%
|-
| style="background-color: " |
|align=left|Leonid Levin
|align=left|A Just Russia
|
|61.85%
|-
|style="background-color:"|
|align=left|Dmitry Filyayev
|align=left|Communist Party
|
|12.33%
|-
|style="background-color:"|
|align=left|Aleksandr Vasilyev
|align=left|Liberal Democratic Party
|
|10.47%
|-
|style="background:"| 
|align=left|Viktoria Dobrovolskaya
|align=left|Communists of Russia
|
|5.99%
|-
|style="background-color:"|
|align=left|Andrey Mamonov
|align=left|Rodina
|
|2.58%
|-
|style="background-color:"|
|align=left|Dmitry Gaynullin
|align=left|Party of Growth
|
|2.35%
|-
|style="background-color:"|
|align=left|Vasily Melnichenko
|align=left|The Greens
|
|1.50%
|-
| colspan="5" style="background-color:#E9E9E9;"|
|- style="font-weight:bold"
| colspan="3" style="text-align:left;" | Total
| 
| 100%
|-
| colspan="5" style="background-color:#E9E9E9;"|
|- style="font-weight:bold"
| colspan="4" |Source:
|
|}

2020

|-
! colspan=2 style="background-color:#E9E9E9;text-align:left;vertical-align:top;" |Candidate
! style="background-color:#E9E9E9;text-align:left;vertical-align:top;" |Party
! style="background-color:#E9E9E9;text-align:right;" |Votes
! style="background-color:#E9E9E9;text-align:right;" |%
|-
|style="background-color: " |
|align=left|Aleksandr Samokutyayev
|align=left|A Just Russia
|162,004
|60.38%
|-
|style="background-color: " |
|align=left|Aleksandr Trutnev
|align=left|Communist Party
|34,925
|13.02%
|-
|style="background-color: " |
|align=left|Vadim Serdovintsev
|align=left|Liberal Democratic Party
|19,803
|7.38%
|-
|style="background-color:"|
|align=left|Yevgeny Vorozhtsov
|align=left|Party of Pensioners
|19,626
|7.32%
|-
|style="background-color: " |
|align=left|Fatima Khugayeva
|align=left|Communists of Russia
|11,118
|4.14%
|-
|style="background-color: " |
|align=left|Kirill Metalnikov
|align=left|Civic Platform
|10,957
|4.08%
|-
| colspan="5" style="background-color:#E9E9E9;"|
|- style="font-weight:bold"
| colspan="3" style="text-align:left;" | Total
| 268,286
| 100%
|-
| colspan="5" style="background-color:#E9E9E9;"|
|- style="font-weight:bold"
| colspan="4" |Source:
|
|}

2021

|-
! colspan=2 style="background-color:#E9E9E9;text-align:left;vertical-align:top;" |Candidate
! style="background-color:#E9E9E9;text-align:left;vertical-align:top;" |Party
! style="background-color:#E9E9E9;text-align:right;" |Votes
! style="background-color:#E9E9E9;text-align:right;" |%
|-
|style="background-color: " |
|align=left|Aleksandr Samokutyayev (incumbent)
|align=left|United Russia
|
|53.64%
|-
|style="background-color:"|
|align=left|Aleksandr Trutnev
|align=left|Communist Party
|
|16.98%
|-
|style="background-color:"|
|align=left|Aleksey Shpagin
|align=left|A Just Russia — For Truth
|
|10.43%
|-
|style="background-color:"|
|align=left|Andrey Rekayev
|align=left|Liberal Democratic Party
|
|5.71%
|-
|style="background-color: "|
|align=left|Igor Nikitenko
|align=left|Party of Pensioners
|
|5.48%
|-
|style="background-color: " |
|align=left|Kirill Metalnikov
|align=left|Yabloko
|
|4.39%
|-
| colspan="5" style="background-color:#E9E9E9;"|
|- style="font-weight:bold"
| colspan="3" style="text-align:left;" | Total
| 
| 100%
|-
| colspan="5" style="background-color:#E9E9E9;"|
|- style="font-weight:bold"
| colspan="4" |Source:
|
|}

Notes

References

Russian legislative constituencies
Politics of Penza Oblast